On 3 August 1989, Olympic Aviation Flight 545, operated by a Shorts 330-200, crashed into a cloud-shrouded Mount Kerkis on Samos due to the pilots using visual flight rules in instrument flight rules conditions. All on board perished. This accident is the worst involving a Shorts 330.

References

External links

Aviation accidents and incidents in 1989
1989 in Greece
Airliner accidents and incidents caused by pilot error
Aviation accidents and incidents in Greece
August 1989 events in Europe